The OZM-3, OZM-4 and OZM-72 are Soviet manufactured bounding type anti-personnel mines.
(fragmentation-barrier mine, in the Russian and other post-Soviet armies as informally called "frog mine" or "witch" )

They are normally painted olive green, and issued with a spool of tripwires and two green painted wooden or metal stakes for affixing the tripwires. Both OZM-3 and OZM-4 have cast iron fragmenting bodies while the OZM-72 also contains preformed steel fragments,  and all three are issued with empty fuze wells, so a variety of fuzing options are possible.

Operation
The mines can be activated by a variety of fuzes, including electronic fuzes or command initiation, although they are most commonly fitted with an MUV booby trap switch which is activated by a tripwire.

On firing, a metal base plate remains in the ground, while the mine body is thrown up by a small lifting charge, but remains attached to a strong wire tether. When the end of the tether is reached at a height of approximately 0.5 m, the main charge explodes and scatters fragments of the casing across a wide area.

OZM mine may sometimes be laid directly on top of an MS-3 mine. The MS-3 is an anti-handling device which closely resembles a PMN mine, except that it has a "blister" on top and operates purely as a pressure-release boobytrap. Lifting an OZM mine (without rendering safe the MS-3 placed underneath) will trigger detonation.

Variants

OZM-3 
 Diameter: 7.6 cm
 Height: 13 cm
 weight: 3.2 kg
 Fragmentation c TNT

OZM-4

OZM-72

Ottawa Treaty
Since the Ottawa Treaty, a number of countries have decided to retain their OZM mines, but convert them to command detonation only by destroying all fuzes which can be indiscriminately activated – potentially by non-combatants or animals. Belarus in particular has decided to keep 200,000 OZM-72.

See also
Valmara 59
Valmara 69
PROM-1
M16 mine
Land mine

Anti-personnel mines
Land mines of the Soviet Union